Abenojar may refer to:
 Dale Abenojar
 Abenójar, Ciudad Real, a municipality in Castile-La Mancha, Spain